Perkinsozoa is a proposed phylum of intracellular parasites in the superphylum Alveolata, which was suggested to account for the genus Perkinsus and other protist species that do not fit into existing Alveolata phyla.

Members
Members of this phylum include Perkinsus marinus, Perkinsus olseni and the genus Parvilucifera.

 Class Perkinsea
 Order Perkinsida Levine 1978
 Family Perkinsidae Levine 1978 em. Adl et al. 2005
 Genus Perkinsus Levine 1978
 Order Phagodiniida Cavalier-Smith 1993
 Family Phagodiniidae Cavalier-Smith 1993
 Genus Phagodinium Kristiansen 1993
 Order Rastrimonadida Cavalier-Smith & Chao 2004
 Family Rastrimonadidae
 Genus Rastrimonas Brugerolle 2003
 Family Parviluciferaceae Reñé & Alacid 2017
 Genus Dinovorax Alacid & Reñé 2017
 Genus Snorkelia Reñé & Alacid 2017
 Genus Parvilucifera Norén, Moestrup & Rehnstam-Holm 1999

Characteristics
Perkinsozoa have been found in marine and limnic environments.

References

 
SAR supergroup phyla
Flagellates
Veterinary protozoology